William T. Dillard II (born 1945) is an American heir and businessman. He serves as chairman and chief executive officer of Dillard's (NYSE:DDS).

Early life
William T. Dillard was born in 1945. His father was William T. Dillard (1914 – 2002), founder of Dillard's. He graduated from the University of Arkansas with a Bachelor of Business Administration and later received an M.B.A. from the Harvard Business School.

Career
Dillard joined the board of directors of Dillard's in 1967. In 1977, he became president and chief operating officer. In 1988, he joined the Board of Acxiom, a marketing technology and services company, and he has served as its vice chairman since 6 May  2006. He also serves as chief executive officer of Dillard's since May 1998 and chairman of the board since May 2002.

Dillard has been on the board of directors of Acxiom China since 1988; Barnes & Noble, since November 1993; the National Advisory Board and Dallas Region Advisory Board of JPMorgan Chase; Western Digital, one of the world's largest hard disk drive manufacturers; Dillards Capital Trust I; Dillard's Properties.

Personal life
One of his brothers, Alex Dillard, is President of Dillard's, while his other brother, Mike, is its Executive Vice President. His son, William T. Dillard III, is Vice President of Dillard's.

References

1945 births
Living people
University of Arkansas alumni
Harvard Business School alumni
American businesspeople in retailing
American Episcopalians
20th-century American businesspeople
21st-century American businesspeople
Businesspeople from Arkansas
American corporate directors